Raizan Oh-tameike Dam is an earthfill dam located in Fukuoka Prefecture in Japan. The dam is used for irrigation. The catchment area of the dam is  km2. The dam impounds about 20  ha of land when full and can store 1200 thousand cubic meters of water.

References

Dams in Fukuoka Prefecture
1944 establishments in Japan